Mississippi Highway 42 (MS 42) is a state highway in southern Mississippi. Portions of this highway run parallel to the Longleaf Trace. The length of highway between Interstate 59 and U.S. Highway 11 in Forrest County, just outside Petal is known as the Evelyn Gandy Parkway.

Route description

MS 42 begins in Lawrence County at the border with Simpson County along Rockport-New Hebron Road. State maintenance begins here and MS 42 heads southeast as a two-lane highway through a mix of farmland and wooded areas for a couple miles to enter the town of New Hebron, entering town along Jones Street before making a left onto Indiana Avenue (at an intersection with unsigned MS 915). The highway passes through a neighborhood along the very northern edge of downtown, where it has an intersection with MS 43 (Franklin Street). MS 42 now leaves New Hebron and immediately enters Jefferson Davis County.

The highway immediately crosses a bridge over West Prong Silver Creek and it winds its way southeast through a mix of farmland and wooded areas for several miles to enter the town of Prentiss at an intersection with US 84. It heads south along 3rd Street through neighborhoods, where it passes by Prentiss Elementary School, before making a right turn onto Columbia Avenue (Original US 84) at the Jefferson Davis County Courthouse. MS 42 heads southwest through downtown for little under a mile to make a left (at an intersection with unsigned MS 937) an immediately come to an intersection with MS 184/MS 13. The highway leaves Prentiss and travels southeast through woodlands for several miles, where it passes by Jeff Davis Lake, through the community of Carson, and through the town of Bassfield (where it has an intersection with MS 35). It passes through the community of Melba before crossing into Lamar County.

MS 42 heads eastward to pass just south of the community of Higgins, where it has an intersection with MS 44, before passing straight through the town of Sumrall, bypassing downtown to the north as it has an intersection with MS 589 (Main Street). The highway heads due east to leave Sumrall and cross into Forrest County.

MS 42 becomes concurrent (overlapped) with US 49 and they head southeast as a four-lane divided highway along the western banks of the Bouie River to pass through the community of Rawls Springs before entering the Hattiesburg city limits and coming to an interchange with I-59 (Exits 67 A/B), which MS 42 splits off of US 49 and begins following, and they head north to cross the Bouie River (where they leave Hattiesburg) before MS 42 gets off at the very next exit (Exit 69) and travels a new four-lane divided highway that entirely bypasses the city of Hattiesburg, Evelyn Gandy Parkway. MS 42 passes eastward through the community of Glendale before crossing a bridge over the Leaf River to enter the neighboring city of Petal. It immediately has an interchange with US 11 before bypassing the city along its north side, where it has an intersection with Central Avenue (Old MS 42) on the east side of town. The highway passes through some neighborhoods for a couple of miles before leaving Petal, as well as the entire Hattiesburg area, and narrowing to two-lanes. It crosses into Perry County shortly thereafter.

MS 42 crosses a bridge over Tallahala Creek to pass through the community of Runnelstown, where it has an intersection with MS 29, before traveling east through a mix of farmland and wooded areas for several miles (where it crosses a bridge over Bogue Homo) to enter the town of Richton. It passes through neighborhoods along Dogwood Avenue before entering downtown and turning north along MS 15 (Front Street). The two highways head straight up the middle of downtown for several blocks before MS 42 splits off along Redbud Avenue to leave Richton and cross the wooded marshland surrounding Thompson Creek. MS 42 passes through the community of East Side before traveling through farmland for several miles to cross into Greene County.

MS 42 continues eastward through farmland for several miles to pass through the community of Sand Hill, where it has a short concurrency with MS 63, before passing through a large woodland tract of the De Soto National Forest, where it connects to the Turkey Fork Recreation Area (via Turkey Fork Road). The highway now exits the National Forest and crosses the Chickasawhay River before entering the town of State Line, passing along the southern side of downtown along St. Peter Street before straddling the Wayne County line at an interchange with MS 57.  It fully enters Wayne County and has a short concurrency with US 45 before coming to the Alabama state, with it continuing towards the town of Chatom as Alabama State Route 56 (SR 56).

History

Until 2007, MS 42's route through the Hattiesburg metropolitan area was very different than it is today. This resulted from the construction of the Evelyn Gandy Parkway, a new four-lane divided expressway that entirely bypasses the city along its northern side, running from I-59 (Exit 69) to the eastern edge of Petal. 

MS 42 entered the city limits from Rawls Springs, concurrent (overlapped) with US 49 as it does today, to the cloverleaf interchange with I-59 (Exits 67 A/B). That's where things change. Instead of splitting off and following the Interstate, it continued along US 49 south for several blocks through a business district before splitting off as a two-lane along what is now known as Old Highway 42. It headed east through an industrial area, where it had an intersection with Main Street (unsigned MS 967), then neighborhoods to an intersection with US 11 (Bouie Street).

The original alignment of MS 42 followed Main Street (now MS 967) directly into downtown, where it then became concurrent with US 11 north (One way pair between Pine Street and Front Street).

MS 42 became concurrent with US 11 and they headed north as a four-lane undivided highway to leave Hattiesburg and cross the Leaf River into neighboring Petal (directly beside where the Bouie River forks off). MS 42 splits off as a two-lane shortly thereafter and followed Central Avenue to cross some railroad tracks and pass directly through downtown. Central Avenue/Old Highway 42 rejoins the current alignment (Evelyn Gandy Parkway) at the eastern end of town.

Major intersections

References

External links

Magnoolia Meanderings

042
Transportation in Lawrence County, Mississippi
Transportation in Jefferson Davis County, Mississippi
Transportation in Lamar County, Mississippi
Transportation in Forrest County, Mississippi
Transportation in Perry County, Mississippi
Transportation in Greene County, Mississippi
Transportation in Wayne County, Mississippi